The 2016–17 National Youth League (also known as the Foxtel National Youth League for sponsorship reasons) was the ninth season of the Australian National Youth League competition.

Teams

Format
The 2016–17 season used the same format as the previous season, with the existing ten NYL teams divided into two conferences of five teams: Conference A consisted of teams from WA, SA, Victoria and Queensland, while teams from ACT and NSW were in Conference B. Teams in each conference played each other on a home and away basis, followed by a Grand Final between the top team from each conference.

Standings

Table of results

Positions by round

Group stage

Conference A
Round 1

Round 2

Round 3

Round 4

Round 5

Round 6

Round 7

Round 8

Round 9

Round 10

Conference B
Round 1

Round 2

Round 3

Round 4

Round 5

Round 6

Round 7

Round 8

Round 9

Round 10

Grand Final

References

External links
 Official National Youth League website

2016–17 A-League season
A-League National Youth League seasons